Merkelbach is an Ortsgemeinde – a community belonging to a Verbandsgemeinde – in the Westerwaldkreis in Rhineland-Palatinate, Germany.

Geography

The community lies in the Westerwald between Limburg and Siegen. It belongs to the Verbandsgemeinde of Hachenburg, a kind of collective municipality. Its seat is in the like-named town.

History
The first mention of Merkelbach was recorded in 1418.

Politics

The municipal council is made up of 10 council members, including the extraofficial mayor (Bürgermeister), who were elected in a majority vote in a municipal election on 13 June 2004.

Economy and infrastructure

The community lies right on Bundesstraße 413, leading from Bendorf (near Koblenz) to Hachenburg. The nearest Autobahn interchanges are in Dierdorf and Neuwied on the A 3 (Cologne–Frankfurt). The nearest InterCityExpress stop is the railway station at Montabaur on the Cologne-Frankfurt high-speed rail line. The community is linked by bus connections every two hours to Hachenburg and the InterCityExpress station at Montabaur.

References

External links
  
 Merkelbach in the collective municipality’s Web pages 

Municipalities in Rhineland-Palatinate
Westerwaldkreis